Photo stitching software produce panoramic pictures and VR photographs. The other method involves using panoramic cameras or panoramic mirror lenses (i.e. one-shot lenses).

General

HDR, tonemapping and exposure fusion

Image corrections

Export options 

(*) Export to HTML 5 usually means WebGL based viewer application.

Compatible equipment

References 

Photo stitching applications